The 2022 Sudamérica Rugby Women's Sevens was held in Saquarema, Brazil from 10-11 June, 2022. It serves as the first qualification tournament for the 2023 Pan American Games. Brazil won the tournament, with Colombia as runners-up and Argentina third.

Teams

Pool stage

Pool A

Pool B

Final & Playoffs

Semifinals 5th place

Semifinals 1st place

Playoffs 
7th Place

5th Place

Bronze Final

Final

Final standings

References 

2022 in women's rugby union
2022 rugby sevens competitions
Rugby sevens competitions in Brazil
Rugby sevens competitions in South America
Sudamérica